Leas or LEAS may refer to:

The Leas, a large area of land owned by the National Trust along the coastal cliffs of South Shields, England
Terrence Leas, American academic and community college president
LEAS, ICAO code for Asturias Airport, Asturias, Spain
 Levels of Emotional Awareness Scale, a scenario-based psychological test

See also
Leas Lift, a funicular railway in Folkestone, Kent, England
LEA (disambiguation)